Povarovo is a rural locality (a village) in Andreyevskoye Rural Settlement, Alexandrovsky District, Vladimir Oblast, Russia. The population was 2 as of 2010.

Geography 
Povarovo is located 100 km northeast of Alexandrov (the district's administrative centre) by road. Shushkovo is the nearest rural locality.

References 

Rural localities in Alexandrovsky District, Vladimir Oblast